John Powers (born 1957) is American born Professor of Asian Studies and Buddhism.  Much of his teaching career was at the Australian  National University in  Canberra.

Studies 
Powers studied at College of the Holy Cross Massachusetts, taking a Bachelor of Arts in Philosophy and Religion there in 1979. He went on to earn a Master of Arts in Indian philosophy at McMaster University in Ontario then a Doctorate of Religious history from the University of Virginia. From 1995 to 2016, Powers taught at the Australian National University, where he was  made professor in 2008.  Powers, like several others, left the university after a controversial restructuring of the department.

A practicing Buddhist, he has special expertise in Buddhism in Tibet. He was invited by the Dalai Lama's Australian office, as the leading expert in the country, to Tenzin Gyatsho's 70th birthday celebration . As well as publishing work on Buddhist spirituality and meditation techniques, he has written extensive translations of Tibetan works, and written on the history and culture of Tibet , India, and China. 

Powers, who supports Tibetan autonomy, has compared the Chinese treatment of the Tibetan people to the fate of the Aborigines during the colonization of Australia.

Publications 
 The Yogācāra school of Buddhism: a bibliography. American Theological Library Association, Vol. 27, 1991
 Hermeneutics and tradition in the Saṃdhinirmocana-sūtra. Indian thought and culture, Vol. 5, BRILL, 1993
 Introduction to Tibetan Buddhism. Snow Lion Publications, 1995
 Wisdom of Buddha: the Saṁdhinirmocana Sūtra. Tibetan translation series, Vol. 16, (Translato), Dharma Publications, 1995
 Scriptures of world religions. McGraw Hill, 1998 (with James Fieser)
 Jñānagarbha's Commentary on just the Maitreya chapter from the Saṃdhinirmocana-Sūtra: study, translation and  Tibetan text. Indian Council of Philosophical Research, 1998
 A Concise  Encyclopedia of Buddhism. Oneworld Publication, 2000
 Religion und Kultur  Tibets. Das geistige Erbe eines buddhistischen Landes. O.W. Barth,  2002
 History as propaganda: Tibetan exiles versus the People's Republic of China. Oxford University Press US, 2004
 A Concise Introduction to Tibetan Buddhism. Snow Lion Publications, 2008
 A Bull of a Man: Images of Masculinity, Sex, and the Body in Indian Buddhism. Harvard University Press, 2009

References

External links 
 C.V. from the ANU
 Chinese authorities in revenge attacks on  Tibetan monks. John Powers interviewed by Tom Fayle, ABC Radio Australia, July 9, 2008

1957 births
Living people
American orientalists
Tibetan Buddhists from Australia
Academic staff of the Australian National University
College of the Holy Cross alumni
McMaster University alumni